Hell Bent for Love is a 1934 American Pre-Code crime film directed by D. Ross Lederman and starring Tim McCoy and Lilian Bond.

Cast
 Tim McCoy as Police Captain Tim Daley
 Lilian Bond as Millicent 'Millie' Garland
 Bradley Page as 'Trigger' Talano
 Vincent Sherman as Johnny Frank
 Lafe McKee as Dad Daley
 Harry C. Bradley as Professor
 Wedgwood Nowell as Attorney Kelly Drake
 Eddie Sturgis as Major Dawson
 Ernie Adams as Henchman Joe Barnard
 Hal Price as Duke Allen
 Max Wagner as Ernest Dallas
 Guy Usher as Police Chief O'Brien
 Edward LeSaint as Judge (as Ed LeSaint)

References

External links
 

1934 films
1934 crime films
American crime films
American black-and-white films
1930s English-language films
Films directed by D. Ross Lederman
Columbia Pictures films
1930s American films